Jacobus Wilhelmus van Zijl  QC (22 December 1909 – 22 January 1992) was a South African judge and Judge President of the Cape Provincial Division of the Supreme Court from 1975 until 1979.

Early life and education 
Van Zijl was born in Cape Town, the son of justice, Hendrik Stephanus van Zyl and his wife, Dorothy Constantia Sauer. He matriculated at Rondebosch Boys' High School, after which he studied law at the University of Stellenbosch.

Career
Van Zijl started practicing as an advocate in 1933 and became a member of the Cape Bar. In 1950 he was permanently appointed a judge to the Cape Provincial Division of the Supreme Court. After the death of Justice Theo van Wyk in 1975, he was appointed as Judge President of the Cape Division. 

In 1950, the South African government set up a Press Commission to monitor the activities of the press and van Zijl was appointed its first chairman.

References

1909 births
1992 deaths
South African judges
20th-century South African judges
Alumni of Rondebosch Boys' High School
Stellenbosch University alumni
South African Queen's Counsel